Pavel Nikolayevich Atman (born 25 May 1987) is a Russian handball player for Maccabi Rishon LeZion and the Russian national team.

References

External links

1987 births
Living people
Russian male handball players
Sportspeople from Volgograd
Expatriate handball players
Russian expatriate sportspeople in Belarus
Russian expatriate sportspeople in Germany
Russian expatriate sportspeople in North Macedonia
Russian expatriate sportspeople in Qatar
Handball-Bundesliga players
RK Vardar players